Zebra is the debut album by the American hard rock band Zebra, released in 1983, eight years after they were founded. The album features all original material, with the exception of "Slow Down" (a Larry Williams tune best remembered for a 1964 cover version by the Beatles) injected at mid-song with much of the second stanza of Carl Perkins' "Blue Suede Shoes", altered at its end:

The album also features two hits which received national airplay: "Who's Behind the Door?" and "Tell Me What You Want". On the strength of both singles the album became one of Atlantic's fastest-selling debut albums ever and peaked at #29, attaining a level of commercial success the band was unable to repeat on subsequent releases.

"Take Your Fingers from My Hair" was covered by Dream Theater for the special edition of their tenth studio album, Black Clouds & Silver Linings.

This album, along with the follow-up No Tellin' Lies, was remastered and reissued by UK-based company Rock Candy Records in 2013.

Track listing

Chart history

Singles

Personnel

Band members 
 Randy Jackson – guitar, lead vocals, piano, Mellotron, synthesizer, percussion
 Felix Hanemann – bass, backing vocals, keyboards, strings
 Guy Gelso – drums, backing vocals, percussion

Session musicians 
 Jack Douglas – keyboards (6), percussion (6)
 Mike Grossman – piano (3)
 Eric Troyer – Prophet synthesizer (7)
 Karen Alta – percussion (3)

Producer 
 Jack Douglas

References

Zebra (band) albums
1983 debut albums
Atlantic Records albums
Albums produced by Jack Douglas (record producer)
Albums recorded at Studio in the Country